Mattawa Airport  is located  southwest of Mattawa, Ontario, Canada.

See also
 Mattawa Water Aerodrome

References

Registered aerodromes in Ontario
Airports in Nipissing District
Mattawa, Ontario